The Note Crisis was a political crisis in Soviet–Finnish relations in 1961. The Soviet Union sent Finland a diplomatic note on October 30, 1961, referring to the threat of war and West German militarization and proposing that Finland and the Soviet Union begin consultations on securing the defence of both countries, as provided for in the Finno-Soviet Treaty of 1948. The note coincided with the detonation of the Tsar Bomba, the most powerful nuclear test in history, and followed close on the heels of the Berlin Crisis and Bay of Pigs Invasion.

The note precipitated a crisis in Finland: activating the military provisions of the treaty would have frustrated Finland's post-war policy of neutrality in international affairs and greatly damaged Finland's relations with the West. One of the crucial goals of Finnish foreign policy was to reinforce the credibility of Finland's neutrality in the eyes of Western powers which were skeptical of the country's ability to resist Soviet influence.

At the time the note was sent, president Urho Kekkonen was in the Hawaiian Islands on vacation, during his successful visit to the United States and Canada. The proposed consultations threatened the achievements of the previous decade, during which Finland had attained UN membership and the Soviets had vacated the Porkkala military base near Helsinki, leased to them in 1944 for fifty years. At worst, the note was seen as the possible first step towards establishing a Soviet military presence in Finland, and even further, the de facto end of Finnish independence.

President Kekkonen handled the matter by arranging a personal meeting with Nikita Khrushchev in Novosibirsk. As a result of the meeting, the Soviet Union agreed to "postpone" the consultations indefinitely, charging the Finns with monitoring the security situation in Northern Europe. The Finnish interpretation of the agreement was that the Soviets thereby left the matter of initiating military consultations to Finnish discretion, and the crisis was defused.

The most common view today is that the Soviet Union was mainly motivated by a desire to ensure Kekkonen's re-election in 1962. Kekkonen, who enjoyed the confidence of the Soviet leadership, was seeking re-election for the first time, and his main opponent, was regarded as having a good chance of victory with the backing of a six-party coalition, including two major parties, the Social Democrats and the National Coalition. The extent to which Kekkonen may himself have been involved in orchestrating the incident is disputed, but it is commonly accepted that he was expecting a Soviet intervention in the presidential election, and Kekkonen is known to have planned dissolving the Finnish parliament, forcing his opponents to campaign together in the Presidential election and against each other in the parliamentary election at the same time.

As a result of the crisis, Honka dropped his candidacy in November 1961, and in January 1962, Kekkonen was re-elected by an overwhelming vote of 199 out of 300 electoral college votes. During his second term in office, the Social Democrats were reconciled with Kekkonen's Agrarian League, leading to a new era in Finnish internal politics dominated by this so-called "red earth" alliance.

Timeline
 
 10 October 1961: President Kekkonen went on a three-week state visit to Canada and to  the United States.
 16. – 17 October 1961: In Washington, Kekkonen discussed with US President John F. Kennedy and Secretary of State Dean Rusk. In a statement concluded at the end of the discussions, the United States stated that it respected Finland's policy of neutrality.
 30 October 1961: In Moscow, Soviet Foreign Minister Andrei Gromyko handed over a note to Finnish Ambassador to the Soviet Union, Eero A. Wuori, drawing attention to the Federal Republic of Germany's increased military activities in the Baltic Sea and proposing "consultations on measures due to the threat of a military attack by NATO". President Kekkonen was informed of the note while he was resting in the Hawaiian Islands. The President continued his original program of visits despite the note. Finnish Foreign Minister Ahti Karjalainen, who was part of the delegation, immediately returned to Finland.
 1 November 1961: Kekkonen gave a speech at the dinner of the World Affairs Council in Los Angeles in which he stated that the note had not brought anything new to the relations between Finland and the Soviet Union, but that it reflected the tension prevailing in Europe. Foreign Minister Karjalainen, who arrived in Helsinki on the same day, announced that the President would give a radio and television message after returning  back to Finland.
 3 November 1961: President Kekkonen returned to Finland. On the same day in Tamminiemi (presidential residence in Helsinki), he met with Prime Minister Martti Miettunen and Foreign Minister Karjalainen and told them that he was preparing a speech in which he would announce that he would refuse consultations and withdraw his presidential candidacy.
 5 November 1961: Kekkonen gave a radio and television message in which he appealed for Finland's policy of neutrality and did not consider it necessary to examine whether the conditions for negotiations required by the Finno-Soviet Treaty existed. However, Kekkonen did not announce his resignation from the presidential candidacy.
 6 November 1961:  Foreign Minister Karjalainen met with the Ambassador of the Soviet Union, Alexei Zakharov. Karjalainen suggested a discussion with Foreign Minister Gromyko on the political side of the note and the postponement of military consultations. The aim of Kekkonen and Karjalainen was to start a discussion with the Soviet leadership only for political reasons and to avoid a discussion about the threat of war and the military side. On November 7, Kekkonen told the Finnish military leadership that military problems were not the main reason for the note, even though the situation was otherwise military. He ordered the military leadership to stay out of the negotiations and also banned the taking of precautionary measures in the garrisons.
 10 November 1961: Foreign Minister Karjalainen fly to Moscow on a negotiating trip .
 11 November 1961:  Foreign Minister Karjalainen negotiated with Foreign Minister Andrei Gromyko in Moscow. Gromyko stated that the Soviet military leadership had long called for military consultations with Finland and that the country's political leadership had so far rejected these demands because it relied on Finland's foreign policy leadership. The Karelian suggested the negotiations were noted for political reasons. Gromyko demanded some quick political evidence from Finland of the continuity of Finland's foreign policy so that military consultations would not have to be started. Karjalainen suggested that bringing forward the parliamentary elections from July to February 1962 could be such evidence.
 12 November 1961: Karjalainen returned to Finland and explained the results of the negotiations to President Kekkonen and the parliamentary groups.
 14 November 1961: President Kekkonen dissolved the Finnish Parliament and ordered new general elections to be held on February 4, 1962.
 15 November 1961: Soviet Deputy Foreign Minister Vasili Kuznetsov informed Finnish Ambassador Wuori that bringing forward the parliamentary elections alone was not enough, but urgent negotiations were still needed, as the international situation had further tightened since the note was handed down due to joint military exercises planned by the Federal Republic of Germany and Denmark.
 17 November 1961: Ambassador Wuori received a hint that President Kekkonen could travel to Novosibirsk in a week to meet Nikita Khrushchev. Wuori arrived in Helsinki the same evening and negotiated in Tamminiemi with Kekkonen, Miettunen and Karjalainen.
 18 November 1961: The Finnish government proposed that President Kekkonen will  meet Khrushchev to resolve the note crisis. On 19 November, Ambassador Zakharov confirmed that Khrushchev was ready for the meeting.
 20 November 1961: Bernard Gufler delivered a secret message from Kennedy to Kekkonen. The US president promised non-military American support for Finnish neutrality and independence.
 22 November 1961: President Kekkonen left for a conference trip to Novosibirsk. According to Ahti Karjalainen, the atmosphere in Helsinki was such that Kekkonen's departure from the main Helsinki Central railway station could have gathered large crowds to sing patriotic hymns as in autumn 1939 just before Winter War. This would have made Kekkonen's negotiations more difficult, so the president's entourage traveled by car from Helsinki first to Loviisa, where Kekkonen met his brother Jussi Kekkonen, and then to Luumäki, where the entourage boarded the  train to Moscow. From Moscow, the Kekkonen continued on November 23 by plane to Novosibirsk.
 24 November 1961: Kekkonen and Khrushchev negotiated all day in Novosibirsk. Kekkonen suggested that the Soviet Union refrain from consultations to prevent an increase in war psychosis. In Kekkonen's opinion, Finland's policy of neutrality provided sufficient security guarantees for the Soviet Union. According to Khrushchev, the note was not due to a lack of confidence in Finland, but to the increased military threat of the Federal Republic of Germany. According to Khrushchev, the Western military alliance NATO was coming under German control, and he was particularly concerned about German military cooperation with Denmark and Norway. Khrushchev stated that the Soviet Union had full confidence in President Kekkonen and then suggested that, because of that confidence, military consultations be postponed only if there was an urgent need. Khrushchev also criticized the actions of Väinö Tanner and Väinö Leskinen, claiming that they were reviving the old brotherhood with Germany and working against the Soviet Union.
 25 November 1961: Olavi Honka withdraws as presidential candidate. The decision was his own personal decision, as the Soviet Union had not made this a condition for waiving consultations. On the same day, Kekkonen returned from Novosibirsk to Moscow and ate lunch with Soviet general secretary Leonid Brezhnev in the Kremlin.
 26 November 1961: President Kekkonen returned to Finland and gave a radio and television speech at 9 pm, in which he announced that the Soviet Union had given up demanding consultations. Kekkonen said that the Soviet Union trusted Finland's policy, but added that "if we cause trust to run out of our own actions, the reason is ours".

See also 
Finlandization
Night Frost Crisis
Paasikivi–Kekkonen doctrine

References

External links
 Noottikriisi. YLEn Elävä arkisto

Further reading
 

Political history of Finland
Finland–Soviet Union relations
1961 in the Soviet Union
1961 in Finland
1961 in international relations
Urho Kekkonen